Once is Enough (French: Il suffit d'une fois) is a 1946 French comedy film directed by Andrée Feix and starring Edwige Feuillère, Fernand Gravey and Henri Guisol.

Cast
 Edwige Feuillère as Christine Jourdan  
 Fernand Gravey as Jacques Reval  
 Henri Guisol as Bernard Ancelin 
 François Joux  
 Made Siamé   
 Hélène Garaud 
 Henri Charrett 
 Ky Duyen

References

Bibliography 
 Brigitte Rollet. Coline Serreau. Manchester University Press, 1998.

External links 
 

1946 films
French comedy films
1946 comedy films
1940s French-language films
Films directed by Andrée Feix
Gaumont Film Company films
French black-and-white films
1940s French films